The 2018 IQA World Cup was the fourth edition of the IQA World Cup, the international quidditch championship organized by the International Quidditch Association, the sport's global governing body. It was held in Florence, Italy between 27 June and 2 July 2018. Australia were the defending champions. The United States won their third championship after beating Belgium in the final. Over 800 athletes participated in competition.

Bidding process
Seven nations expressed interest in hosting the tournament: Australia, Belgium, France, Italy, Turkey, the United Kingdom, and the United States. On 1 November, Florence, Italy was announced as the host.

Participating teams

Twenty-nine participated in the tournament:

Draw
Teams are placed in drawing pots based on their geographical location and their standing in the previous World Cup and European Games as follows:

 Pot 1 contains the non-European teams that finished 7th or better at the 2016 World Cup as well as the best ranked teams from the 2017 European Games, for a total of seven teams.
 Pot 2 contains the remaining non-European teams except Mexico.
 Pot 3 contains the European teams ranked 5th to 11th at the 2017 European Games.
 Pot 4 contains all remaining European teams.

Mexico is automatically assigned a spot as the 8th ranked team at the 2016 World Cup.

The teams are drawn from the pots into six groups of four teams (A, B, C, D, E, and F) and one group of five teams (G). Teams from Pot 1 are drawn into each group's first position. Mexico takes position G2 and the other second positions are taken from Pot 2. Pot 3 teams are drawn in each group's third position, and the remaining positions are drawn from Pot 4.

Group stage
In the group stage, teams compete in a cross-pool league system, whereby the teams in Group A play against the teams in Group B and similarly for Groups C and D, and Groups E and F. Only teams in Group G are playing against each other. At the end of the group stage, all teams are ranked together based on their performance.

Group A vs. Group B

Group C vs. Group D

Group E vs. Group F

Group G

Knockout stage

Upper bracket

Quarter-final consolation

Round of 16 consolation

Lower bracket

Lower bracket consolation

Relegation round-robin

References

2018 in Italian sport
21st century in Florence
2018
July 2018 sports events in Italy
June 2018 sports events in Italy
Sports competitions in Florence